Thomas Nelson Page (April 23, 1853 – November 1, 1922) was an American lawyer, politician, and writer. He served as the U.S. ambassador to Italy from 1913 to 1919 under the administration of President Woodrow Wilson during World War I.

In his writing, Page popularized Plantation tradition literature which was used to promote the Lost Cause myth across the New South. Page first got the public's attention with his story "Marse Chan" which was published in the Century Illustrated Monthly Magazine. Page's most notable works include The Burial of the Guns and In Ole Virginia.

Life and career

Page was born in one of the Nelson family's plantations in Oakland, near the village of Beaverdam in Hanover County, Virginia. He was the son to John Page, a lawyer and a plantation owner, and Elizabeth Burwell (Nelson). He was a scion of the prominent Nelson and Page families, each First Families of Virginia.

Although he was from once-wealthy lineage, after the American Civil War, which began when he was only 8 years old, his parents and their relatives were largely impoverished during Reconstruction and his teenage years.

In 1869, he entered Washington College, known now as Washington and Lee University, in Lexington, Virginia when Robert E. Lee was president of the college. In Page's later literary works, Robert E. Lee would come to serve as the model figure of Southern Heroism. Page left Washington College before graduation for financial reasons after three years, but continued to desire an education specifically in law. To earn money to pay for his degree, Page tutored the children of his cousins in Kentucky. From 1873 to 1874, he was enrolled in the law school of the University of Virginia. At Washington College and thereafter at UVA, Nelson was a member of the fraternity of Delta Psi, (St. Anthony Hall).

Career 
Admitted to the Virginia Bar Association, he practiced as a lawyer in Richmond between 1876 and 1893, and also began his writing career.  In 1893, Page, who had become disillusioned with the Southern legal system, gave up his practice entirely and moved with his wife to Washington, D.C.

There, he wrote eighteen books that were compiled and published in 1912. Page popularized the plantation tradition genre of Southern writing, which told of an idealized version of life before the Civil War, with contented slaves working for beloved masters and their families. Page viewed the Antebellum South as a representation of moral purity, and often vilified the reforms of the Gilded Age as a sign of moral decline.

His 1887 collection of short stories, In Ole Virginia, is Page's quintessential work, providing a depiction of the Antebellum South. His most well-known short-story from that collection was "Marse Chan". "Marse Chan" was popularized because of Page's ability to capture southern dialect. Another short-story collection of his is entitled The Burial of the Guns (1894). As a result of his literary success, Page was popular amongst the Capital elite, and was regularly invited to socialize with politicians from around the country.  During the first quarter of the 20th century, he founded a library in the Sycamore Tavern structure near Montpelier, Virginia, in memory of his wife, Florence Lathrop Page.

Under President Woodrow Wilson, Page was appointed as U.S. ambassador to Italy for six years between 1913 and 1919. There he supported the Czechoslovak Legion in Italy. Despite being untrained in Italian and having little experience in governmental affairs, Page was determined to do a good job. He eventually learned Italian, formed beneficial relationships with Italian government officials, and accurately reported on the Italian state during World War I. Page managed to maintain and improve American-Italian relations during World War I, and provided a sympathetic ear to the Italian and Triple Entente cause in the U.S government. After a disagreement with President Wilson over the terms of the Treaty of Versailles, in which he argued for increased Italian benefits, Page resigned his post in 1919. His book entitled Italy and the World War (1920) is a memoir of his service there.

After returning to his home in Oakland, Virginia, Page continued to write for the remainder of his years.

Writing themes

Page's postbellum fiction featured a nostalgic view of the South in step with what is termed Lost Cause ideology. Twisting the historical reality of slavery, enslaved people are depicted as faithful, happy and simple, slotted into a paternalistic society. For example, the formerly enslaved person in "Marse Chan" is uneducated, speaks phonetically, and has unrelenting admiration for his former master. The gentry are noble and principled, with fealty to country and to chivalry—they seem like knights of a different age. The strain epitomized by Page would carry through the postwar era, cropping up again in art with films like The Birth of a Nation. The ideology and thoughts that appear in Page's writing and in Southern ideology are no mere simplistic, archaic world-view; they are part of a complex history that has informed, for worse and for better, the evolution of the Southern mind to 1940.

Thomas Nelson Page lamented that the slavery-era "good old darkies" had been replaced by the "new issue" (Blacks born after slavery) whom he described as "lazy, thriftless, intemperate, insolent, dishonest, and without the most rudimentary elements of morality" (pp. 80, 163). Page, who helped popularize the images of cheerful and devoted Mammies and Sambos in his early books, became one of the first writers to introduce a literary black brute.

In 1898 he published Red Rock, a Reconstruction novel, with the heinous figure of Moses, a loathsome and sinister Black politician. Moses tried to rape a white woman: "He gave a snarl of rage and sprang at her like a wild beast" (pp. 356–358). The depiction of rape using animal metaphors was a common feature of American sentimental literature. He was later lynched for "a terrible crime".

Page dealt with the morality of lynching by acquitting the mob from any guilt, holding, instead, the supposedly debased Blacks responsible for their own violent executions. In his 1904 essay, The Negro: The Southerner's Problem, he wrote:

Likewise, Thomas Nelson Page complained that African American leaders should cease "talk of social equality that inflames the ignorant Negro," and instead, work to stop "the crime of ravishing and murdering women and children."

Reception and criticism
Thomas Nelson Page was one of the best-known writers of his day. He served as Woodrow Wilson's ambassador to Italy, and the president referred to him as a "national ornament".

In her effort to control the image of slavery and Civil War in the American mind, Mildred Lewis Rutherford, historian general of the United Daughters of the Confederacy from 1911 to 1916, urged that "no library should be without…all of Thomas Nelson Page's books".

Modern historian David W. Blight calls it "America's national tragedy" that American memory was informed by the "romantic fantasies" of writers like Page and Joel Chandler Harris, while the authentic memories of former slaves were largely forgotten. He approvingly cites Sterling A. Brown's ironical criticism: "Thomas Nelson Page was not lying in his eulogy of the mammy…Page's feeling is honest if child-like. I am sure that he loved his mammy to death."

Personal life 
He was married to Anne Seddon Bruce on July 28, 1886. She died on December 21, 1888 of a throat hemorrhage. He remarried on June 6, 1893, to Florence Lathrop Field, a daughter of Jedediah Hyde Lathrop and the widowed sister-in-law of retailer Marshall Field (her husband Henry Field had died less than three years earlier). Page's second wife Florence was a member of the prestigious Barbour family, making Page a member by marriage.

Page was an activist in stimulating the Association for the Preservation of Virginia Antiquities to mobilize to save historical sites at Yorktown and elsewhere, especially in the Historic Triangle of Virginia, from loss to development. He was involved in gaining Federal funding to build a seawall at Jamestown in 1900, protecting a site where the remains of James Fort were later discovered by archaeologists working on the Jamestown Rediscovery project.

He died in 1922 at the age of 69 at Oakland, Virginia in Hanover County, Virginia.

Publications

 In Ole Virginia, or Marse Chan and Other Stories (1887) short stories.
 Befo' de War: Echoes in Negro Dialect (1888) poems.
 Two Little Confederates (1888) short novel for young readers.
 Among the Camps (1891) short stories for young readers.
 Elsket, and Other Stories (1891) short stories.
 On Newfound River (1891) novel.
 The Old South: Essays Social and Political (1892) essays.
 The Burial of the Guns (1894) short stories and one novella.
 Pastime Stories (1894) short stories.
 Unc' Edinburg: A Plantation Echo (1895).
 Social Life in Old Virginia Before the War (1896).
 The Old Gentleman of the Black Stock (1897) novella.
 Red Rock: A Chronicle of Reconstruction (1898) novel.
 Santa Claus's Partner (1899).
 A Captured Santa Claus (1900).
 Gordon Keith (1903) novel.
 Two Prisoners (1903).
 Bred in the Bone (1904) short stories.
 The Negro (1905).
 The Coast of Bohemia (1907) poems.
 John Marvel, Assistant (1907) novel.
 Under the Crust (1907) short stories and one play.
 The Old Dominion: Her Making and Her Manners (1908) essays.
 Tommy Trot's Visit to Santa Claus (1908).
 Robert E. Lee: The Southerner (1908).
 Mount Vernon and Its Preservation, 1858-1910 (1910).
 Robert E. Lee: Man and Soldier (1911).
 The Land of the Spirit (1913).
 The Page Story Book (1914).
 The Stranger's Pew (1914) short story.
 The Shepherd Who Watched by Night (1916).
 Address at the Three Hundredth Anniversary of the Settlement of Jamestown (1919).
 Italy and the World War (1920).
 Dante and His Influence: Studies (1922).
 The Red Riders (1924).

Selected articles
 "Lee in Defeat," The South Atlantic Quarterly, Vol. VI (1907).
 "The Spirit of a People Manifested in their Art," Art and Progress, Vol. II (1910).
 "Our Relation to Art," The American Magazine of Art, Vol. XIII (1922).

Collected works
 The Novels, Stories, Sketches and Poems of Thomas Nelson Page (18 vols., 1910–12).

See also
Thomas Nelson Page House, listed on the National Register of Historic Places

References

Further reading

 Bailey, Fred Arthur (1997). "Thomas Nelson Page and the Patrician Cult of the Old South," International Social Science Review, Vol. 72, No. 3/4, pp. 110–121.
 Baskervill, William Malone (1911). "Thomas Nelson Page." In: Southern Writers. Nashville, Tenn.: Publishing House M.E. Church, South, pp. 120–151.
 Bundrick, Christopher (2008). "Return of the Repressed: Gothic and Romance in Thomas Nelson Page's Red Rock," South Central Review, Vol. 25, No. 2, pp. 63–79.
 Cable, George W. (1909). "Thomas Nelson Page, a Study in Reminiscence and Appreciation," Book News Monthly, Vol. 18, pp. 139–140.
 Christmann, James (2000). "Dialect's Double-Murder: Thomas Nelson Page's 'In Ole Virginia'," American Literary Realism, Vol. 32, No. 3, pp. 234–243.
 Coleman, Charles W. (1887). "The Recent Movement in Southern Literature," Harper's Magazine, Vol. 74, pp. 837–855.
 Flusche, Michael (1976). "Thomas Nelson Page: The Quandary of a Literary Gentleman," The Virginia Magazine of History and Biography, Vol. 84, No. 4, pp. 464–485.
 Gaines, Anne-Rosewell J. (1981). "Political Reward and Recognition: Woodrow Wilson Appoints Thomas Nelson Page Ambassador to Italy," The Virginia Magazine of History and Biography, Vol. 89, No. 3, pp. 328–340.
 Gordon, Armistead C. (1924). "Thomas Nelson Page (1853–1922)." In: Virginian Portraits. Staunton, Va.: McClure Company, pp. 125–137.
 Gross, Theodore L. (1966). "Thomas Nelson Page: Creator of a Virginia Classic," The Georgia Review, Vol. 20, No. 3, pp. 338–351.
 Holman, Harriet R. (1969). "Thomas Nelson Page's Account of Tennessee Hospitality," Tennessee Historical Quarterly, Vol. 28, No. 3, pp. 269–272.
 Holman, Harriet R. (1970). "The Kentucky Journal of Thomas Nelson Page," The Register of the Kentucky Historical Society, Vol. 68, No. 1, pp. 1–16.
 Holman, Harriet R. (1970). "Attempt and Failure: Thomas Nelson Page as Playwright," The Southern Literary Journal, Vol. 3, No. 1, pp. 72–82.
 Kent, Charles W. (1907). "Thomas Nelson Page," The South Atlantic Quarterly, Vol. 6, pp. 263–271.
 Martin, Matthew R. (1998). "The Two-Faced New South: The Plantation Tales of Thomas Nelson Page and Charles W. Chesnutt," The Southern Literary Journal, Vol. 30, No. 2, pp. 17–36.
 McCluskey, John (1982). "Americanisms in the Writings of Thomas Nelson Page," American Speech, Vol. 57, No. 1, pp. 44–47.
 Mims, Edwin (1907). "Thomas Nelson Page," The Atlantic Monthly, Vol. 100, pp. 109–115.
 Page, Rosewell (1923). Thomas Nelson Page. New York: Charles Scribner's Sons.
 Quisenberry, A.C. (1913). "The First Pioneer Families of Virginia", Register of the Kentucky State Historical Society, Vol. 11, No. 32, pp. 55, 57–77.
 Roberson, John R. (1956). "Two Virginia Novelists on Woman's Suffrage: An Exchange of Letters between Mary Johnston and Thomas Nelson Page," The Virginia Magazine of History and Biography, Vol. 64, No. 3, pp. 286–290.
 Wilson, Edmund (1962). Patriotic Gore: Studies in the Literature of the Civil War. New York: Oxford University Press.

External links

 
 
 Works by Thomas Nelson Page, at Hathi Trust
 Works by Thomas Nelson Page, at JSTOR
 
 Social Life in Old Virginia before the War. New York: Charles Scribner's Sons, 1897.
 
 
 Thomas Nelson Page, 1853–1922
 

1853 births
1922 deaths
19th-century American novelists
20th-century American novelists
Ambassadors of the United States to Italy
American essayists
American white supremacists
American male novelists
American memoirists
American people of English descent
American people of Scottish descent
19th-century American poets
American male short story writers
Nelson family of Virginia
Thomas Nelson Page
People from Hanover County, Virginia
Novelists from Virginia
Novelists of the Confederacy
Writers from Washington, D.C.
20th-century American poets
American male poets
American male essayists
19th-century American short story writers
Writers of American Southern literature
University of Virginia School of Law alumni
Washington and Lee University alumni
People from Dupont Circle
Barbour family
20th-century American male writers
20th-century American diplomats
Burials at Rock Creek Cemetery
Neo-Confederates
Members of the American Academy of Arts and Letters